This is a list of mayors of Newport Beach, California since Newport Beach was incorporated in 1906

List
 John King* 1906–1908
 C. A. Barton* 1908–1910
 A. N. Smith* 1910–1912
 Albert Hermes* 1912–1914
 W. K. Parkinson* 1914–1916
 Stetson R. Jumper* 1916–1917 (resigned mid-term)
 H. A. Robinson* 1917–1918
 J. P. Greeley* 1918–1922
 J. J. Schnitker* 1922–1924
 George P. Wilson* 1924–1926
 Dr. Conrad Richter* 1926–1928
 Marcus J. Johnson 1928–1932
 Dr. Herman Hilmer 1932–1936
 Harry H. Williamson 1936–1940
 Irvin George Gordon 1940–1942
 Clyan H. Hall 1942–1946
 O. B. Reed 1946–1948
 Dallas K. Blue 1948 (resigned mid-term)
 Dick Drake 1948-1950
 Lester L. Isbell 1950–1952
 A. W. Smith 1952 (resigned mid-term)
 Norman Miller 1952–1954
 Dora O. Hill 1954–1958
 James B. Stoddard 1958–1962
 Charles E. Hart 1962–1964
 Paul J. Gruber 1964–1968
 Doreen Marshall 1968–1970
 Edgar F. Hirth 1970–1972
 Donald A. McInnis 1972–1976
 Howard Rogers 1976 (died in office)
 Milan M. Dostal 1976–1978
 Paul Ryckoff 1978–1980
 Jacqueline E. Heather 1980–1982
 Evelyn R. Hart 1982–1984
 Philip Maurer 1984–1986
 John C. Cox, Jr. 1986–1988
 Donald A. Strauss 1988–1989
 Ruthelyn Plummer 1989–1990
 Phil Sansone 1990–1992
 Clarence J. Turner 1992–1994
 John W. Hedges 1994–1996
 Janice A. Debay 1996–1997
 Thomas Cole Edwards 1997–1998
 Dennis D. O’Neil 1998–1999
 John E. Noyes 1999–2000
 Garold B. (Gary) Adams 2000–2001
 Tod W. Ridgeway 2001–2002
 Steven Bromberg 2002–2003
 Tod W. Ridgeway 2003–2004
 Steven Bromberg 2004–2005 (resigned mid-term)
 John Heffernan 2005
 Don Webb 2005–2006
 Steven Rosansky 2006–2007
 Edward D. Selich 2007–2009
 Keith Curry 2009–2010
 Michael Henn 2010-2011
 Nancy Gardner 2011–2012
 Keith Curry 2012-2013
 Rush N. Hill, II 2013-2014
 Edward D. Selich 2014-2015
 Diane Brooks Dixon 2015-2016
 Kevin Muldoon 2016-2017 
 Duffy Duffield 2017–2018
 Diane Brooks Dixon 2018-2019
 William O'Neill 2019-2020
 Brad Avery 2020–2021
 Kevin Muldoon 2021-2022
 Noah Blom 2022-2023
 *Until 1927, the governing body of the City was known as a Board of Trustees with a President as its head; an act of the Legislature in 1927 changed the Board to City Council with a Mayor as the head.

References

Newport Beach
Government in Orange County, California
M